Kalinite is a mineral composed of hydrated potassium aluminium sulfate (a type of alum).  It is a fibrous monoclinic alum, distinct from isometric potassium alum, named in 1868. Its name comes from kalium (derived from Arabic: القَلْيَه al-qalyah “plant ashes”) which is the Latin name for potassium, hence its chemical symbol, "K".  

A proposal to remove recognition of kalinite as a mineral species was submitted to the International Mineralogical Association, however, kalinite is still on the list of approved minerals.  Many older samples, however, have been found to be potassium alum.

Environment 
Kalinite is a rare secondary mineral observed in the oxidized zone of mineral deposits, as efflorescence on alum slates, in caves, and as a volcanic sublimate.  It is associated with jarosite, KFe3+3(SO4)2(OH)6, and cuprian melanterite (pisanite), (Fe2+,Cu2+)SO4·7H2O, at Quetena, Chile.

References 

Aluminium minerals
Potassium minerals
Sulfate minerals
Monoclinic minerals
Minerals in space group 15